Ellen Hattie Clapsaddle (January 8, 1865 - January 7, 1934) was an American illustrator/commercial artist in the late 19th and early 20th centuries.  Not only is her style greatly admired and well recognized, today she is recognized as the most prolific souvenir/postcard and greeting card artist of her era.

Childhood
Clapsaddle was born during the Civil War period in the small farming community of South Columbia in Herkimer County, New York, near Columbia, New York on January 8, 1865.

She was the child of Dennis L. and Harriet (Beckwith) Clapsaddle. From an early age she loved to draw—she is said to have been a shy and delicate child who displayed artistic ability and was highly encouraged by her parents to develop her skills in art.

Clapsaddle was the great-granddaughter of the American Revolutionary War hero, Major Dennis Clapsaddle.

Education
Clapsaddle attended a one-room school until the 8th grade.  She then boarded in Richfield Springs, Otsego County, New York, and attended the local Richfield Springs Seminary, a local academy (later known as high schools) in Richfield Springs that prepared young ladies for higher education, today known as a college.  She graduated in 1882.

Her parents and teachers highly encouraged her to pursue a career in art.  She may have applied and received a scholarship to attend a selective private college for two years, the Cooper Institute known as the Cooper Union Institute for the Advancement of Science and Art in New York City.  Only highly recognized individuals are chosen to attend this college and all attend on scholarship. There is no documentation, yet found,  that she ever went there.

Upon the completion of her studies, around 1884, she returned to her parents' home in South Columbia, NY.  She placed an ad in a local newspaper to offer private painting lessons and began her career of teaching art out of her home.

Art
Clapsaddle started by giving art lessons in her home in South Columbia.  At the same time she created her own landscapes and was commissioned to paint portraits of families in Richfield Springs.  She also submitted her work to publishers in New York City and became a recognized commercial artist.  She was a freelance artist and her illustrations were often used in advertising and on porcelain goods, calendars, paper fans, trade and greeting cards.

Clapsaddle's greatest success was in the development of her artwork into single-faced cards that could be kept as souvenirs or mailed as postcards and she specialized in designing illustrations specifically for that purpose. Artistic designs had become highly prized particularly during the peak of production of the "golden age of souvenir/postcards" (1898–1915) for their great marketing possibilities. Clapsaddle is credited with over 3000 designs in the souvenir/post card field.

Themes
Several of the themes in her artwork command high interest given the variety and occasions for their use. 
Valentine's Day- with or without children
St. Patrick's Day- more than 80 different cards
Fourth of July- showing George Washington, Uncle Sam, Lady Liberty, eagles, cannons, flags, the liberty bell, fireworks, Revolutionary War figures, nautical subjects, etc.,
Halloween-  some of the most highly prized by collectors
Christmas - including transportation designs as a theme with Irish families in automobiles of that period on the highways, or airplanes in the skies and even on dirigibles.

Recent discoveries
Her identity and background seem to have remained obscure, but looking into her ancestry has yielded some information.

"...Ellen Hattie Clapsaddle was destined to become the most prolific postcard and greeting card artist of her time."

"...renowned for her gift of painting adorable children, one of the most famous and sought after artists (of souvenir/postcards) ... her artwork has universal appeal..."

"...her art expressed an innocence and joy of life that emanated from the child-like happiness deep within her."

"...her distinctive style allows many connoisseurs of her art the ability to recognize the details of her artwork."

"...her designs reflect the entire spectrum of seasonal and holiday themes, drawing upon folklore, traditions, games and nursery rhymes."

"Reproductions of her illustrations frequently appear on contemporary vintage-style decorative accessories as well."

More than half of the estimated over 3,000 signed souvenir/postcards, as Ellen H. Clapsaddle, as well as the unsigned ones, show illustrations of children in their full innocence and sweet faces while the rest show scenes that are more general.  Many of them include children of different races and cultures of the world.  Collectors have come to recognize the quality and charming nature of her personal style and work without question or dispute.

Not only are the "original" single-faced cards sought after by collectors, the large numbers of them that have survived for over 100 years, whether signed or unsigned, attest to the longevity of the appeal of her artwork.  In particular, her "mechanical" cards or anything else with her name on it, or not, are highly sought after by collectors of her work.

One of her card designs from 1910, Midnight Angel, was chosen by the United States Postal Service for the 1995 traditional Christmas Stamp.

In recent years, more than 100 years later, her artwork is still as popular today as it was when it first appeared in the commercial art world.  Her work is so admired that it is generating new types of items to display her artwork since the copyright notices have expired, such as:

 Clapsaddle Private Collections on CDs containing more than 300 of her souvenir/postcards;
 Downloadable ClipArt;
 Art Poster Prints as unframed art in enlarged versions of 29" x 20" available for framing; 4) Publications recently printed with images of her work for the modern collectors to use as a guide in obtaining some of the original ones;
 Iron-on Appliqués for transfer to items of clothing;
 Reproduction postcards as new issue;
 New art by contemporary artists like a Large Santa Claus and a Patriotic Santa in a 40" x 26" frame;
 New popcorn and cookie tins as well as reproductions of advertisements bearing her artwork.

Some private collectors have amassed more than 1,600 original Clapsaddles, as her souvenir/postcards are commonly known.  The original cards have appeared in local and state trade shows for years and many websites have large numbers available where the number varies from 900 to 1,000 cards are offered surpassing the numbers available for other artists of similar work.

A few years ago, the Richfield Springs, New York local newspaper announced the display of some of her work locally, especially a 1900 calendar.  She received a great deal of praise in the daintiness of the designs, the originality of the work, and the little verses that illustrate her drawings.

Recently, a memory book for wedding occasions, called "The New Wedding Album" illustrated by Clapsaddle and published by Eaton & Mains, has come to light.  It is made in half-silk and white paper boards and it is decoratively stamped in silver with floral motifs.

A long-time collector, Elizabeth Austin, created a "checklist" of Clapsaddle's souvenir/postcards for other collectors so they can identify the ones they do not have.  The late Ellen Budd expanded on the list with many missing cards and has published them as a reference work (see the Bibliography section below).

Her name has been famous for decades in her hometown area of Richfield Springs, NY, and in the collecting circles where many collectors have specialized strictly in the collection of just her work and her work alone.

Career
Clapsaddle's father died on January 5, 1891, and she and her mother went to live with an aunt in Richfield Springs.  Clapsaddle spent her next fourteen years not only giving art lessons, but also creating and selling illustrations, landscapes, and portraits commissioned by local wealthy families, and freelance artwork that she submitted to various publishers through the mail out of an art studio in downtown Richfield Springs.

Initially, two of her designs were accepted by the International Art Publishing Company in New York City to be used as souvenir/postcards that became an immediate success as bestsellers.  After that initial purchase of two designs, several others followed and they retained her to work along with other artists.  Because she became their premier illustrator due to the popularity and successful marketability of her designs, the company invited her to move to the city around 1895.

Soon, by 1901, the International Art Publishing Company also offered her a paid 2-year trip to Germany for her and her mother.  While in Germany, she refined her art talent by working directly and closely with the German engravers who were the actual manufacturers of the products offered for sale.  Her designs started to appear in various forms like Valentines, souvenir/postcards, booklets, watercolor prints, calendars, and trade cards and other objects in the world of advertising.

By this time, Germany was the center of the high-end publishing world and many publishers in the United States depended on them for the final products that were shipped to the U.S.  Clapsaddle was with her mother, when she died on March 2, 1905.  The death of Mrs. Harriet Clapsaddle
occurred at 'Derthick Cottage last Friday and the funeral was held Monday afternoon, Rev. Edmond G. Rawson officiating. Mrs.
Clapsaddle has been in poor health for a longtime and had been tenderly cared for by her daughter, Miss Ellen Clapsaddle. The
deceased was the widow of -the 'late Dean Clapsaddle and was born in the town of Columbia about 65 years ago.

Clapsaddle spent some years in Germany, funded by the International Art Publishing Company, and then returned to New York well before her mother's death in 1905. It is said that she established the Wolf Company backed by the Wolf brothers—a full subsidiary of the International Art Publishing Company of New York City. She was the first and only female souvenir/postcard artist of the era to establish her own enterprise.  She was the sole artist and designer for this company. More documentation is being south for this,

At that time, few women were even employed as full-time illustrators.  For 8 years she and the Wolf brothers enjoyed their success and there seemed to be no limit to the growth potential in the souvenir/postcard industry.  (Some sources suggest that she was employed by the Wolf brothers).  Nevertheless, confidence in the boom and high return in profits in this specialized area of commercial art during this boom period, led her and her partners to invest heavily in the years that followed in many Germany engraving and publishing firms.  She returned once again to Germany to work with the engravers and publishers they used because they had the best printing plants.
  
The postcard and greeting card business was doing well, and Clapsaddle was making good money most of which she invested in German printing firms.

World War I
By 1914, the war broke out. The majority of the souvenir/postcard publishers in the United States depended on German supplying firms but once they became disconnected from them, they had to go out of business.  Many German factories suffered total destruction from bombings and all of Clapsaddle's recent original artwork may have been lost along with the investments in those firms because of the destruction of the records and messages going back and forth between the continents that never arrived or were never answered.  Clapsaddle, is on the passenger list on the ship OSCAR II, document can be found on ancestry dot com. She returned in 1915. News of her safe arrival was posted in her hometown newspaper, the Richfield Springs Mercury, July 29, 1915 "People generally will be interested in knowing that the artist, Miss Ellen Clapsaddle, who is a native of this
place, has returned from Berlin, where she has spent several years, and has notified her friends of her safe arrival in New York."

Although the United States did not enter the war until 1917, Clapsaddle was safe at home in her two homes in NYC and in Richfield Springs   .

Post-war
With the end of the war in 1919, Miss Clapsaddle was looking forward to returning to Germany.  She has spent the time from 1915 on, working and   living in New York City, and visiting her second home in Richfield Springs NY, as evidenced by the many newspaper posts such as this in her hometown newspaper, the Richfield Springs Mercury.

On April 9, 1920, Clapsaddle, who spent the winter months in New York City, moved to her home in the Chase House on Lake Street. In 1920, she was living in an apartment in Manhattan  at the elegant Prince George Hotel, as stated in the 1920 census, as per the U.S Census.

It was reported that on Saturday, May 28, 1921, she sailed for Germany. On Jan 14 1922, 9 months later, she returned to NY on the ship George Washington.

Between 1920-30 she visited Richfield Springs, but less frequently as per this news insert: 
1930 Ellen Clapsaddle after  an absence of several years is making a short visit in town . Miss Clapsaddle is a well known artist here, and has resided in Europe and New York City.

In 1930 she was living as a lodger in Manhattan, at 125 East 30th St. as per the U. S. Census

Later, she was admitted to the Peabody Home for  Aged and Indigent Women on Pelham Parkway in New York City in January 1932.  One wonders if her finances suffered because of the depression...or if she were there, simply  due to being aged.  One day short of her 69th birthday in 1934 she died; services were held in her home town; she was buried next to her parents on January 12, 1934

Interment
She died on January 7, 1934. Services were held January 10, 1934 and she was buried that day alongside her parents in Lake View Cemetery.

Bibliography
Clapsaddle's name appears frequently in newspaper and magazine articles that discuss the postcards and greeting cards collectibles market.  Her work is included and appears in any collection of vintage postcard art, or discussions about that art:

Halloween Postcard Book—by Ellen Clapsaddle and others, Applewood Books; 10pp., 2004.
Ellen H. Clapsaddle Signed Post Cards: An Illustrated Reference Guide, Ellen H. Budd, EH Budd; 194pp., 1989.
The Official Guide to Flea Market Prices, 2nd edition, Harry Rinker, House of Collectibles; 512pp., 2004.
Death Makes a Holiday: A Cultural History of Halloween, David J. Skal, 256pp., 2002.

Notes

References

U.S. Passport Applications, 1795–1925, Ancestry.com. Retrieved 2010-09-20.

External links

 Ellen Clapsaddle Valentine Postcards at Bonza Sheila
Ellen Clapsaddle Profile - The Artistry of Ellen Clapsaddle

1865 births
1934 deaths
Artists from New York (state)
Postcard artists
Cooper Union alumni
American women illustrators
American illustrators
People from Herkimer County, New York
19th-century American artists
19th-century American women artists
20th-century American artists
20th-century American women artists